Old Joe is a prehistoric rock art panel near Norfork in Baxter County, Arkansas. It consists of two shapes painted with a red pigment. The first figure resembles one located at another site further down the White River.

The site was listed on the National Register of Historic Places in 1982.

See also
National Register of Historic Places listings in Baxter County, Arkansas

References

Archaeological sites on the National Register of Historic Places in Arkansas
National Register of Historic Places in Baxter County, Arkansas
Rock art in North America
Native American history of Arkansas
Art in Arkansas